United States gubernatorial elections were held in four states in October and November 2011, with regularly scheduled elections in Kentucky, Mississippi, and Louisiana; and a special election in West Virginia. None of these four governorships changed party hands, with Democratic incumbents Steve Beshear and Earl Ray Tomblin winning in Kentucky and West Virginia, respectively; and Republicans re-electing Bobby Jindal in Louisiana and holding the open seat in Mississippi.

Predictions

Race summary

Closest races 
States where the margin of victory was under 5%:
 West Virginia, 2.5%

Blue denotes states won by Democrats.

Kentucky 

On July 19, 2009, Steve Beshear announced his intention to run for re-election in 2011 and that then-Louisville mayor Jerry Abramson would be his running mate. On January 6, 2011, Beshear and Abramson officially filed their candidacy.

Businessman Phil Moffett, Jefferson County Clerk Bobbie Holsclaw, and  State Senate president David L. Williams were the declared Republican candidates. 
Agriculture commissioner Richie Farmer Secretary of State Trey Grayson, and Businessman Bill Johnson, were also speculated candidates, but all declined. However, Farmer would run as Williams' running mate. The Williams-Farmer ticket won the primary on May 17.

In the general election, Beshear won, defeating Williams and independent candidate Gatewood Galbraith.

Louisiana 

In 2008 Bobby Jindal stated that it was unlikely he would run for president in 2012 and that his primary electoral goal in the future would be on re-election in 2011. On August 15, 2010, he confirmed his intention to run for re-election.

Candidates who opposed Jindal included Attorney Cary Deaton (D), Teachers Tara Hollis (D) and Trey Roberts (D), victim advocacy activist Androniki "Niki Bird" Papazoglakis (D), Former Vice Chairman of the Libertarian Party of Louisiana Scott Lewis, ex-Louisiana Department of Health and Hospitals David Blanchard (I), Computer Engineer Lenny Bollingham (I), Accountant Ron Ceasar (I), and Retired Volunteer Fire Chief Bob Lang (I).

The election was then held on October 22 with all the candidates competing in a nonpartisan blanket primary. Jindal was elected to a second term, receiving an outright majority of the vote (thus a runoff election that would have occurred on November 19 became unnecessary).

Mississippi 

Incumbent Governor Haley Barbour was term-limited in 2011.

The Republican candidates included author, small business owner, and Baptist minister James Broadwater; Lt. Governor Phil Bryant; former New Orleans Federal Reserve Board Chairman Dave Dennis; and  Pearl River County District Supervisor Hudson Holliday. Bryant won the Republican nomination by a wide margin.

Prominent state businessman Bill Luckett and Hattiesburg Mayor Johnny DuPree were two declared Democratic candidates. Dupree defeated Luckett in the Primary runoff to win the Democratic nomination.

Bryant ended up defeating Dupree in the general election.

The Lieutenant Governor was elected separately.

West Virginia (special) 

The Supreme Court of Appeals of West Virginia ruled on January 18, 2011 that the state must hold a special gubernatorial election in 2011 to fill the vacancy resulting from Joe Manchin's election to the United States Senate. State Senate President Earl Ray Tomblin ascended to the office of Acting Governor in 2010; he is eligible to seek election for the remainder of Manchin's term and has stated that he will do so.

Other Democratic candidates included state House Speaker Rick Thompson, Acting President of the West Virginia Senate Jeffrey V. Kessler, state Secretary of State Natalie Tennant, and state Treasurer John Perdue. Tomlin overcame intra-party opposition in the May 14 primary and thus advanced to the general election.

The Declared Republican candidates include former Secretary of State Betty Ireland, state Senate Minority Whip Clark Barnes, and Putnam County Prosecutor Mark Sorsaia. U.S. Representative Shelley Moore Capito and businessman John Raese have both stated that they will not run. Businessman Bill Maloney won the Republican primary in an upset and faced Tomblin in the general election.

In the general election, Tomblin defeated Maloney.

Notes

References